Ruys's bird-of-paradise is a bird in the family Paradisaeidae that is presumed to be an intergeneric hybrid between a magnificent bird-of-paradise and lesser bird-of-paradise.

History
Only one adult male specimen is known of this hybrid; it is held in the Netherlands Natural History Museum in Leiden, and comes from near Warsembo, on the west coast of Geelvink Bay, in north-western New Guinea.

Notes

References
 

Hybrid birds of paradise
Birds of New Guinea
Intergeneric hybrids